Brandy is an alcoholic beverage made by wine distillation. Related drinks include 
 Pomace brandy
 Fruit brandy

Brandy may also refer to:

Geography
 Brandy City, California, an unincorporated community in Sierra County
 Brandy Carr, a village in the city of Wakefield in West Yorkshire, England
 Brandy Cove, a small beach in the Gower Peninsula, South Wales
 Brandy Pond, a small lake in Naples, Maine
 Brandy Station, Virginia, an unincorporated community in Culpeper County

People
Brandy (given name), a given female name

Music 
 Brandy Norwood (born 1979), American singer known professionally as Brandy
Brandy (album), an album by Brandy Norwood
"Brandy" (Scott English song), a 1971 song, covered under the title "Mandy" in 1975 by Barry Manilow
"Brandy (You're a Fine Girl)", a 1972 song by Looking Glass
 "Brandy", a song by Joseph B. Jefferson and Charles B. Simmons performed by The O'Jays on their 1978 album So Full of Love

Other uses
Brandy, a GPL clone of the programming language BBC BASIC
 Brandy & Mr. Whiskers, an American animated television series 
 Brandy & Ray J: A Family Business, a new series on VH1 starring Brandy Norwood
 Brandy v Human Rights and Equal Opportunity Commission, an Australian High Court case
 Brandy (film), a 1963 Spanish western film

See also
 Brandys (disambiguation)
 Brandi, a given name or surname